Championship Off-Road Racing (usually abbreviated CORR) was a sanctioning body for short course off-road racing in the United States. It formed in 1998 and went bankrupt in 2008. Its Midwest races were supplanted in 2007 by the Traxxas TORC Series and by the Lucas Oil Off Road Racing Series on the West Coast in 2009. Both received most of the drivers and adopted the same racing format.

History
CORR was formed in 1998 by ESPN announcer Marty Reid. It displaced the SODA series at the premiere short course off-road racing series when most of the drivers in SODA moved to CORR. The series was purchased by Jim Baldwin in 2005.

Baldwin canceled two of the rounds at Las Vegas in October 2008. In a press release, he stated: "Championship Off Road Racing has made the difficult decision to cancel the Primm, Nevada race on October 25th and 26th. The current credit crisis has made it very difficult to cover CORR’s costs." He filed for bankruptcy and abandoned the sanctioning body's facilities in Chula Vista, California.

Classes
There were ten classes in the series.

The eight truck classes were: Pro 4, Pro 2, Pro Spec, Pro Lite, and Trophy Kart (Junior I, Junior II, Modified).

The three buggy classes were: Pro Buggy, Single Buggy, and Light Buggy

Pro 4
The trucks were built or manufactured as a full-size, four-wheel-drive type utility vehicle, capable of being driven through the front wheels. Vehicle must be a standard manufacturer production model available to the general public in the U.S. Vehicle style must have the manufacturer production of 5,000.

Past Champions
2008 Carl Renezeder
2007 Carl Renezeder
2006 Johnny Greaves
2005 Johnny Greaves
2004 Jason Baldwin
2003 Carl Renezeder
2002 Johnny Greaves
2001 Rob MacCachren
2000 Rob MacCachren
1999 Walker Evans
1998 Jack Flannery

Pro 2
Specs: The trucks were built or manufactured as a full-size, two-wheel-drive type utility vehicle, weighing at least 3400 pounds. Vehicle must be a standard manufacturer production model available to the general public in the U.S. Vehicle style must have the manufacturer production of 5,000. Manufacturer body styles and engines must be from the same manufacturer. 
Horsepower: 8 cylinders, 750-900 HP.
Suspension: Front wheel travel limit 18"; rear wheel travel limit 20".
Chassis: Maximum wheelbase 120"; minimum wheelbase 113"; maximum track width 93".
Body: Maximum body width 80".
Weight: Minimum weight with driver ; minimum front axle weight 48% of total truck weight.
Tire Size: 35 x 12.50 maximum.
Numbering: 1-99.

Past Champions
2008 Rob MacCachren
2007 Jerry Whelchel
2006 Carl Renezeder
2005 Carl Renezeder
2004 Scott Taylor
2003 Scott Taylor
2002 Scott Taylor
2001 Scott Taylor
2000 Scott Taylor
1999 Scott Taylor
1998 Ricky Johnson

Pro-Lite
Vehicle style must have had a manufacturer production of 5,000.

Past Champions
2008 Marty Hart
2007 Rob Naughton
2006 Chad Hord
2005 Jeff Kincaid
2004 Kyle LeDuc
2003 Jeff Kincaid
2002 Jeff Kincaid
2001 Jeff Kincaid
2000 Jeff Kincaid
1999 Johnny Greaves
1998 Johnny Greaves

Other notable drivers
Jason Baldwin – late son of Jim Baldwin, was killed in a plane crash on November 19, 2005.
Jim Baldwin
Josh Baldwin – son of Jim Baldwin
Scott Douglas
Evan Evans
Brendan Gaughan – the future NASCAR driver competed in the Pro-2 division in the 1997 Winter Series and 1998 season.
Robby Gordon
Rick Huseman
Jimmie Johnson – the future seven-time Sprint Cup Series champion won the 1997 Winter Series Pro-2 championship at Glen Helen Raceway, CORR's first event after taking over from SODA.
Jeremy McGrath
Rod Millen
Rodrigo Ampudia – Made history as being the first international driver to win a CORR race.
Evie Baldwin aka Prettymuddy
Cissy Baldwin
Kelley Renezeder
Rhonda Konitzer
Travis Pastrana
Carl Renezeder
Art Schmitt
Keith Steele – 23 seasons,  2008 WSORR Driver of the Year, 2009 TORC Driver of the Year, 44 career wins, BorgWarner World Champion 2000, 2004,2006, 2008

Tracks
Bark River International Raceway 
Chula Vista, California in the "Otay Ranch" neighborhood (Baldwin's construction company built a temporary circuit)
Crandon International Off-Road Raceway 
Heartland Park Topeka 
I-96 Speedway 
Langlade County Speedway
Pomona Fairplex
Las Vegas Motor Speedway
Stafford Motor Speedway
Route 66 Raceway
Indiana State Fairgrounds
Unadilla MX
Texas Motor Speedway
Antelope Valley Fairgrounds
Trollhaugen
Milan, Michigan
Midwest Off-Road Raceway
Luxemburg Speedway

References

External links

Official website

Off-road racing series
Auto racing organizations in the United States
Organizations disestablished in 2008
Defunct auto racing series